Mathibe Rebecca Mohlala is a South African politician. She was elected as a Member of Parliament in the National Assembly for the Economic Freedom Fighters party in 2019.

Since becoming an MP, she has served on the Standing Committee on Finance.

References

External links

Living people
Year of birth missing (living people)
Members of the National Assembly of South Africa
Women members of the National Assembly of South Africa
Economic Freedom Fighters politicians
21st-century South African politicians